This article is a list of transport means that cross Victoria Harbour in Hong Kong.

Ferry routes
Coral Sea Ferry
Sai Wan Ho - Kwun Tong
Sai Wan Ho - Sam Ka Tsuen
Fortune Ferry
 Central - Hung Hom
 North Point - Kwun Tong
Star Ferry
 Central - Tsim Sha Tsui
 Wan Chai - Tsim Sha Tsui
Sun Ferry
North Point - Hung Hom
North Point - Kowloon City

Road tunnels
 Vehicular harbour crossings in Hong Kong
Cross-Harbour Tunnel (opened 1972)
Eastern Harbour Crossing (opened 1989)
Western Harbour Crossing (opened 1997)

MTR
 Tsuen Wan line - between Tsim Sha Tsui and Admiralty stations (opened 1980)
 Eastern Harbour Crossing - Tseung Kwan O line - between Yau Tong and Quarry Bay stations (opened 1989 as part of Kwun Tong line between Lam Tin and Quarry Bay)
 Immersed tube tunnel carrying Tung Chung line and Airport Express of MTR - between Hong Kong and Kowloon stations (opened 1998)
 Sha Tin to Central Link (cross-harbour section) (Contract 1121) - East Rail - between Hung Hom and Exhibition Centre stations (opened in 2022)

Water supply

Several supply tunnels across the harbour, e.g., one which lands in Admiralty.

Sewerage
Harbour Area Treatment Scheme (HATS, previously known as Strategic Sewage Disposal Scheme (SSDS)) - 23.6 km-long system of tunnels deep underground from Kowloon and northeastern part of Hong Kong Island to Stonecutter's Island

Power cable
 A 720-MVA cross-harbour link between Hongkong Electric's and CLP Power's grids.

See also
 Transport in Hong Kong
 List of tunnels and bridges in Hong Kong

References

Transport in Hong Kong
Subterranean Hong Kong
Hong Kong transport-related lists
Victoria Harbour
Transport infrastructure in Hong Kong
Routes